Riaba is a town in Equatorial Guinea. It is also the 30th largest settlement in the country. It was founded in 1779 under the name of Concepción by the frigate lieutenant Guillermo Carboner. It was reestablished by the British in 1821.

Location and population

It is located in the province of Bioko Sur.

It has a (2005 est.) population of 1,071.

Road communications

The European Union and the ADB in cooperation with the Equatorial Guinean government have developed a road network on Bioko connecting Riaba with other towns such as Luba and Malabo.

References

Populated places in Bioko Sur
Bioko
1821 establishments in the British Empire
Populated places established in 1821